Pierre Jesus Sebastian Castel (born 1926) is a French businessman, the founder of the Castel Group, a French beverages company.

Early life
Pierre Jesus Sebastian Castel founded the Castel Group in Bordeaux in 1949, along with his eight siblings.

Career
Castel is CEO and president of Patriarche, and the president of Cassiopée Limited, which has a global presence in the beverage industry. He is also the founder and president of Castel-Frères, with roots in the wine and spirits sector. He has been involved in the beverage industry for over 60 years, specializing in breweries, wineries, and carbonated drinks.

According to Forbes, Castel and his family had a net worth of $15.6 billion as of November 2019. They are listed at number 125 on Forbes’ list of global billionaires, and ranked the 6th richest in France.

He has been named in the Pandora Papers.

Personal life
Castel is married and lives in Geneva, Switzerland.

References 

1972 births
Living people
French expatriates in Switzerland
French company founders
French billionaires